The John B. Connally Unit is a maximum-security prison for males located in unincorporated Karnes County, Texas, United States. The unit is named for former Governor and United States Treasury Secretary John B. Connally, Jr.

History
The prison opened in July 1995. On December 13, 2000, the prison became infamous after seven inmates staged an elaborate breakout that was successful; this group later became known as the Texas Seven. During the subsequent crime spree, the seven fugitives killed a police officer in Irving. Six of the inmates were later recaptured in January 2001, while the seventh committed suicide before being captured; the six who were recaptured were sentenced to death.

Notable inmates
 The Texas Seven, who escaped in December 2000, and caused the death of Irving police officer Aubrey Hawkins during a robbery. One of them committed suicide while on the run; the others were recaptured, tried, and convicted of the Hawkins murder, all being sentenced to death. As of December 2018, the two surviving members of the seven are incarcerated in the Allan B. Polunsky Unit.
 Joseph C. Garcia (executed December 4, 2018)
 Randy Ethan Halprin
 Larry James Harper (committed suicide while on the run)
 Patrick Henry Murphy, Jr.
 Donald Keith Newbury (executed February 2, 2015)
 George Rivas (ringleader, executed February 29, 2012)
 Michael Anthony Rodriguez (declined appeals beyond mandatory, executed August 14, 2008)
 Carlton Dotson, former Baylor Bears basketball player who pleaded guilty to the murder of Patrick Dennehy, his teammate
 Bernie Tiede, mortician and convicted murderer who was the subject of the 2011 film Bernie
Raymond Ayala, Houston, Texas rapper better known as “Lil Bing”, convicted murder and rapper

References

External links

 Connally Unit

Prisons in Texas
Buildings and structures in Karnes County, Texas
1995 establishments in Texas